The Men's Young Player of the Year is an annual Úrvalsdeild honor bestowed on the best young player in the league following every season. The winner receives the Örlygur Cup, named after Örlygur Aron Sturluson.

All-time award winners
The following is a list of the all-time Úrvalsdeild Men's Young Player of the Year winners.

References

External links
Icelandic Basketball Federation Official Website 

European basketball awards
Úrvalsdeild karla (basketball)